Baiya Township (白垭乡) is a township in Dêgê County, Garzê Tibetan Autonomous Prefecture, Sichuan, China.

Subdivisions
Baiya Township contains seven villages: Lengcha, Linxue, Achi, Nizu, Rihuo, Wose, and Cha'an.

See also 
 List of township-level divisions of Sichuan

References

Township-level divisions of Sichuan
Populated places in the Garzê Tibetan Autonomous Prefecture